Jacek Bodyk (born 12 June 1966) is a Polish former cyclist. He competed in the road race at the 1988 Summer Olympics.

Palmares

1987
1st Stage 9 Tour de Pologne
1988
1st Stage 4 Tour de Pologne
1989
1st Stages 1 & 2 Tour de Pologne
1st Stage 9 Niedersachsen-Rundfahrt
1990
1st Stage 8 Peace Race
1st stage 6b Circuit de Lorraine
1991
1st Tour of Małopolska
1994
1st Grand Prix Cristal Energie
1994
3rd Course de la Solidarité Olympique

References

1966 births
Living people
People from Polkowice
Polish male cyclists
Cyclists at the 1988 Summer Olympics
Olympic cyclists of Poland
Sportspeople from Lower Silesian Voivodeship